Shane Valdez (born July 25, 1972), is an American drummer, drum technician, music producer, and songwriter.

About 
Shane Valdez started his music career in 1991 in the hardcore band Hold True which recorded a demo in 1992 which was later remixed, remastered and released as an E.P. CD on Lost & Found Records in 1995.  While studying music business at Fullerton College, Shane engineered and produced a demo for the band Outnumbered who were subsequently signed to Tooth & Nail Records.

In January 1994, Shane joined the hardcore band Bonesaw  Previously signed to Nemesis Records, Bonesaw jumped to Lost & Found Records based in Germany and subsequently recorded the CD "abandoned" which was released in June 1994.  At this time Shane began endorsing Vans shoes and the now defunct company Rimshot Drumsticks.  In the fall of 1994, Shane and Bonesaw completed an eight-country European tour to support the CD. Bonesaw then recorded the CD "Shadow of Doubt", which was released in July 1995, on which Shane played the drums as well as sang all of the lead vocals. "Shadow of Doubt" featured Shane's photographs on the front and rear cover of the CD.

In January 1995, Shane started another project with former members of Hold True. The project was an alternative rock band called Sum of One which played most of the local venues in Southern California and recorded two demos, which Shane also produced.  They independently released the full-length CD "Strategic Overlook" on Master Wes Records in April 2000 (which featured Shane's photography on the rear cover and interior of the CD) and disbanded in January 2001.

Shane lent a helping hand to his friends, Tooth & Nail Records recording artists Plankeye, in July 1998. After their drummer resigned, Shane filled in on their U.S. tour to support their fourth CD "The One and Only".

In January 2001, Shane moved to Lahaina, Hawaii where he met guitarist/vocalist/songwriter Greg Torzillo. Shane moved to Seattle, Washington in October 2001 and in December 2001, Shane joined Torzillo's alternative rock band, Sun King, for a four-month tour of South Korea.

In the summer of 2003, Shane and Torzillo formed the alternative rock band Boxes And Keys. They then completed a four-month tour of South Korea in the summer of 2003. April 2005 brought the release of Boxes And Keys' CD "Soju Experience", on 704 Records, which was also co-produced by Shane and featured his photography on the cover.  Then in the summer of 2005 they completed a 110-date tour of South Korea.

While living in Seattle, Shane began acting as the drum tech for several bands such as Second Coming (formerly on Capitol Records) and Faceless.

In early 2006, Shane began working with the rockabilly/psychobilly band Three Bad Jacks as Road Manager and occasional fill-in drummer.  When the drum throne became available in August 2006, Shane was hired as the Three Bad Jacks drummer and toured internationally with the band throughout the United States and Europe.

Shane expanded his artistic endeavors in 2016 to include photography and street art.

Equipment
In September 2006, Shane began endorsing Thrust Custom Drums and, in June 2007, Shane began endorsing Aquarian Drumheads and Ultimate Ears in-ear monitors.
Drums - Thrust Custom Drums
18"x24" Kick drum - 10-ply Maple
6.5"x14" Snare drum - Nickel-plated Brass Shell
10"x13" Tom-tom drum - 6-ply Maple
18x16" Floor tom drum - 6-ply Maple
Cymbals - Sabian
14" AAX Stage top Hi-hat
14" AASizzle bottom Hi-hat
18" AAXplosion Crash cymbal
18" AAXplosion Crash cymbal
19" AAXplosion Crash cymbal
21" HH Raw Bell Dry Ride cymbal
Drum Heads - Aquarian Drumheads
Toms: (13", 16") Texture Coated Studio X (top - recording), Studio X (top - live), Classic Clear (bottom)
Bass Drum: (24") Super-Kick I (batter), Regulator with 4 3/4" offset hole (resonant)
Snare: (14") Hi-Velocity (top), Hi-Performance (bottom)
Sticks - Pro-Mark
Pro-Mark TX747N Nylon-tipped Hickory drumsticks
In-Ear Monitors - Ultimate Ears
Ultimate Ears UE-7 Pro
Shane also uses DW Hardware and pedals.
Camera - Canon EOS 5D Mark III

Discography

References

External links 
 Bonesaw History
 Bonesaw myspace page
 Thrust Custom Drums website
 Aquarian Drumheads website
 Ultimate Ears website
 Three Bad Jacks website
 Pro-Mark website
 PhotosByShaneV website
 The Sugar Daddys Facebook page

1972 births
Living people
American rock drummers
People from Garden Grove, California
Musicians from California
20th-century American drummers
American male drummers
21st-century American drummers
20th-century American male musicians
21st-century American male musicians